A Guided filter is an edge-preserving smoothing light filter. As with a bilateral filter, it can filter out noise or texture while retaining sharp edges.

Comparison 
Compared to the bilateral filter, the guided image filter has two advantages: bilateral filters have high computational complexity, while the guided image filter uses simpler calculations with linear computational complexity. Bilateral filters sometimes include unwanted gradient reversal artifacts and cause image distortion. The guided image filter is based on linear combination, making the output image consistent with the gradient direction of the guidance image, preventing gradient reversal.

Definition 
One key assumption of the guided filter is that the relation between guidance  and the filtering output  is linear.

In order to determine the linear coefficient , constraints from the filtering input  are required. The output  is modeled as the input  with unwanted components , such as noise/textures subtracted.

The basic model：

(1)　　

(2)　　

in which:
  is the  output pixel;
  is the  input pixel;
  is the  pixel of noise components;
  is the  guidance image pixel;

The reason to use a linear combination is that the boundary of an object is related to its gradient. The local linear model ensures that  has an edge only if  has an edge, since .

Subtract (1) and (2) to get formula (3)；At the same time, define a cost function (4)：

(3)　　

(4)　　

in which 
  is a regularization parameter penalizing large ;
  is a window centered at the pixel .

And the cost function's solution is：

(5)　　

(6)　　

in which

After obtaining the linear coefficients , the filtering output  is provided by the following algorithm:

Algorithm 
By definition, the algorithm can be written as:

Algorithm 1. Guided Filter 
input： filtering input image  ，guidance image   ，window radius  ，regularization 

output： filtering output 

1.
  = 
  = 
  = 
  = 

2.
  = 
  = 

3.
  = 
  = 

4.
  = 
  = 

5.
  = 

 is a mean filter with a wide variety of O(N) time methods.

Properties

Edge-preserving filtering 
When the guidance image  is the same as the filtering input . The guided filter removes noise in the input image while preserving clear edges.

Specifically, a “flat patch” or a “high variance patch” can be specified by the parameter  of the guided filter. Patches with variance much lower than the parameter  will be smoothed, and those with variances much higher than  will be preserved. Both of them define the edge/high variance patches that should be kept and noise/flat patches that should be smoothed.”

Gradient-preserving filtering 
When using the bilateral filter to filter an image, artifacts may appear on the edges. This is because of the pixel value's abrupt change on the edge. These artifacts are inherent and hard to avoid, because edges appear in all kinds of pictures.

The guided filter performs better in avoiding gradient reversal. Moreover, in some cases, it can be ensured that gradient reversal does not occur.

Structure-transferring filtering 
This property enables some special filtering-based applications, such as feathering, matting and dehazing.

Implementations 
 MATLAB
 OpenCV
 FFmpeg

See also 
 Bilateral filter

References 

Computer graphics
Image processing
Image noise reduction techniques